Rangeela is the third studio album by English singer Shireen Jawad, released on 8 April 2013 by Laser Vision.

Composition and release
Rangeel features nine folk songs composed by eight prominent fusion composers of Bangladesh, of which two are traditional and seven are new. Habib Wahid, Bappa Majumdar, Fuad, Hridoy Khan, Rumel, Rumman, Rafa and Raihan have composed songs for the album.

The album was released by Laser Vision on 8 April 2013. Laser Vision launched the music video of "Chengra Chabiwala" as part of the promotion.

Track listing

References

External links

2013 albums
Bengali-language albums
Laser Vision albums
Shireen Jawad albums